Stitch! is a Japanese anime spin-off series of Disney's Lilo & Stitch franchise. It is the second television series in the franchise, following Lilo & Stitch: The Series (2003–2006) and preceding Stitch & Ai (2017). It was produced by Madhouse for its first two seasons (2008–2010), and by Shin-Ei Animation for its third season (2010–2011) and two post-series TV specials (2012 and 2015). Walt Disney Television International Japan co-produced all episodes and specials. The series was also edited for international audiences; the series's English dub aired from 2009 to 2013, and the dubbed versions of the post-series specials aired in 2014 and 2016.

Note that Stitch/Experiment 626 appears in every episode, so he is not included in the "Experiment appearances" list. The international version of the anime, which includes the English dub, is edited from the Japanese original, with some episodes trimmed to eleven-minute segments and combined with other trimmed episodes, and some episodes have aired earlier or later in order as a result of these and other changes. The international episode numbers in the below tables are based on the episode order used by Disney+ Hotstar, although this does not correspond to the English dub's original air dates. Furthermore, the three post-season specials in Japan are considered regular episodes internationally, airing before the final regular episodes of their respective seasons outside of Japan.

Series overview

Stitch! (season 1; 2008–2009)

Stitch! ~The Mischievous Alien's Great Adventure~ (season 2; 2009–2010) 
Beginning after "BooGoo", this season introduces an ending segment called "Kung Fu Dragon Pleakley", where Pleakley faces off against another alien character, usually one of Jumba's experiments, in a martial arts-style match. This segment was dropped beginning from Tigerlily's eponymous episode and is not available on Disney+.

Stitch! ~Best Friends Forever~ (season 3; 2010–2011)

Stitch! New Specials (post-series specials)
On Disney+, both specials have been split into two episodes each and are listed as part of season three (Stitch! ~Best Friends Forever~).

See also
 Stitch!
 List of Lilo & Stitch: The Series episodes
 Stitch & Ai

Notelist

References

External links

Lilo & Stitch (franchise)
Lists of Disney Channel television series episodes
Lists of anime episodes